Self-Portrait at the age of 13 is a silverpoint drawing  by Albrecht Dürer, dated 1484. It is now in the Albertina museum, Vienna. It is the artist's oldest known drawing, and one of the oldest extant self-portraits in European art. It was completed two years before Albrecht left his father's apprenticeship to study under Michael Wolgemut, whom he quickly realised was a valuable mentor but whom the younger man also recognized to be unequal to himself in his abilities. 

Throughout his life Dürer expressed resolute self-confidence. He celebrated himself in his drawings and writings. His four known self-portraits were all completed before he entered his 30s, and so they predate his mature period. As with the other three self-portraits, which are oil paintings, this work can be interpreted as having recorded Dürer's awareness of, and confidence in, his great-yet-still-developing artistic powers. This tone is especially evident in the subject's precocious countenance. Dürer presents himself in half-length and in side view, in a pose closely resembling the one seen in a surviving portrait attributed to his father, also Albrecht, who was a goldsmith by profession. 

The artist's left arm is raised, while his index finger, in a gesture seen many times in depictions of Christ, boldly points to an unidentified area outside the picture’s frame. Dürer presents himself in a flattering light: He has long hair, he has the pleasing appearance of a fresh-faced boy, and he has elegant and elongated fingers (at the time, this was a characteristic both fashionable and seen to indicate draftsman skills). Dürer wrote in 1528, in reference to his relatively unsophisticated youthful drawings, that even his simple sketches expressed "the spiritual essence of an artist's creative impulse"—since a talented artist could express more in a simple line-drawing than a mediocre artist could express in a year of painting.

It is said that the self-portrait was set as a task by Albrecht the Elder as a challenge for his son. It was signed at some unknown later date with the words "This I drew myself from a mirror in the year 1484, when I was still a child. Albrecht Dürer". Dürer was born in May 1471, and he himself did not title the work; given that it was completed in 1484, it is almost equally as likely Dürer had created it when he had been 12 years old, even though the self-portrait is commonly known by the "at the age of 13" title.

Notes

Bibliography

 Bieler, Stacey. Albrecht Durer: Artist in the Midst of Two Storms. Cascade Books, 2017.  
 Brion, Marcel. Dürer. London: Thames and Hudson, 1960
 Hall, James. The Self-portrait: A Cultural History. London: Thames & Hudson, 2014. 
 Porcu, Costantino (ed). Dürer. Rizzoli, Milano 2004
 Chipps Smith, Jeffrey; Silver, Larry (eds). The Essential Durer. University of Pennsylvania, 2011. 

1484 in art
1484 works
Drawings by Albrecht Dürer
Self-portraits by Albrecht Dürer
Collections of the Albertina, Vienna